Dean Finlay (born 7 May 1965) is a New Zealand cricketer. He played in one first-class match for Central Districts in 1988/89.

See also
 List of Central Districts representative cricketers

References

External links
 

1965 births
Living people
New Zealand cricketers
Central Districts cricketers
Cricketers from Palmerston North